Daraja Academy is a secondary school for Kenyan girls located outside of Nanyuki, Kenya.

History 
Daraja Academy is a secondary school to educate Kenyan girls who cannot otherwise afford the fees associated with public secondary schools in Kenya. The first class enrolled in 2009. As of 2015, Daraja Academy has 45 alumnae, and the school has 110 students in the 4 year Academy and 26 Transition (5th-Year) Students). Daraja Academy's educational curriculum adheres to the Kenya Certificate of Secondary Education (KCSE) standards. 

The academy is situated on the former campus of the Baraka School, a small education program that took at-risk 12-year-old boys from the Baltimore public school system to the Kenyan outback which was featured in the 2005 documentary film The Boys of Baraka.

Daraja Academy was the first project of Daraja Education Fund, a registered 501(c)3 non-profit, formed in 2006 by Jason and Jenni Doherty, educators from the San Francisco Bay Area.

See also

 Education in Kenya
 List of schools in Kenya

References

External links
 Daraja Academy

2009 establishments in Kenya
Buildings and structures in Rift Valley Province
Education in Rift Valley Province
Educational institutions established in 2009
Girls' schools in Kenya
Laikipia County
High schools and secondary schools in Kenya